The Club Atlético Celaya was a Mexican football club from Celaya, Guanajuato. The club was formed in 1994 when the two second-division clubs Atletico Cuernavaca (Morelos) and Escuadra Celeste de Celaya (Guanajuato) merged. Another team, Atlético Español, was also merged at a later date. The club folded in 2003.

History
All merging clubs have brought a piece of their old identity into the new formed club: from Atlético Cuernavaca were taken the name to the new club (although its name is also identical with former Atlético Español), from Celeste de Celaya were taken their light blue colors and from Atlético Español the mascot, the bull, which has also given the new team their nickname toros (bulls).

Atlético Celaya has taken the second-division position of their predecessors and has immediately reached the top-level. The first year in Primera División was also their most successful season ever. First, they could win their group and in the play-offs they could make their way up to the finals in which they lost only due to the away-goal-rule after playing 1:1 and 0:0 with Necaxa.

But from now on the club finds itself in lower regions of the table. They had also financial problems which led to the sale of their first-division-license to an industrialist from Morelos in winter 2002–03. He formed a new team with the name Colibríes de Morelos but it disappeared as fast as it once appeared. At the same time when Atlético Celaya has disappeared, their older city neighbour Club Celaya was reactivated again when CF La Piedad moved to Celaya.

Crest and colours
The club's original colors in the 1950s were red and white. In the late 1980s and early 1990s, the club started using black and white with a topical v shape across the chest for home games and a black stripe shirt for away games, which they still use to this date.

Colours

First kit evolution

Famous players

  Diego Cagna
  Diego Latorre
  Antonio Mohamed
  Richard Zambrano
  Ivan Hurtado"El Avetruz"
  Julio César de León"El Leon Indomable"
  Carlos Pavón "El Tanque Catracho"
  Ignacio Ambríz
  José Damasceno "Tiba"
  Félix Fernández
  Jaime Lozano
  Hugo Sánchez
  Pepe Soto
  Emilio Butragueño
  Rafael Martín Vázquez
  Míchel
  Rafael Paz

Honours
Won promotion to the Primera División in 1994–95
Emilio Butrageño & Hugo Sanchez retired from Atletico Celaya

Football clubs in Celaya
Association football clubs established in 1994
Ascenso MX teams